260a Squadriglia was Italy's first naval fighter squadron. It served during the last year of World War I, from November 1917 to November 3, 1918. It operated Macchi seaplane fighters over the northern Adriatic Sea. During Italy's final offensive, it flew overland missions to support Italy's army in its victory over the Austro-Hungarian Empire. The squadron had three pilots become flying aces while serving with it.

History
260 Squadriglia was Italy's first naval fighter squadron, being founded early in November 1917. It was stationed at Sant' Andrea Seaplane Station near Venice in the northern Adriatic Sea.

The unit operated against similar Austro-Hungarian seaplane units based on the eastern shore of the Adriatic. During Italy's final victorious offensive at Vittorio Veneto, the naval squadron delivered overland strikes in support of the Italian Army. On 2 November 1918, a stunting squadron member named Pagliacci realized that the city below, Trieste, was devoid of retreating enemy forces. The pilot landed and was the first Italian serviceman to re-enter the city.

Commanding officers
 Tenente di Vascello (Naval Lieutenant) Luigi Bologna: November 1917
 Tenente di Vascello Federico Martinengo: December 1917
  Tenente di Vascello Bortolozzo

Notable members
 Federico Martinengo
 Orazio Pierozzi
 Umberto Calvello
 Giorgio Parodi and Carlo Guzzi

Aircraft
The squadron field tested the Hanriot HD.1 seaplane version, and the SIA 7. However, the squadron operated the Macchi M.5, and was known to have the Macchi M.7 on strength. Squadron insignia was six black bands painted about the rear of the fuselage.

Endnotes

References
 Franks, Norman; Guest, Russell; Alegi, Gregory.  Above the War Fronts: The British Two-seater Bomber Pilot and Observer Aces, the British Two-seater Fighter Observer Aces, and the Belgian, Italian, Austro-Hungarian and Russian Fighter Aces, 1914–1918: Volume 4 of Fighting Airmen of WWI Series: Volume 4 of Air Aces of WWI. Grub Street, 1997. , .

Italian Air Force
Military units and formations of Italy in World War I
Military units and formations established in 1917
1917 establishments in Italy